The Pinatar Arena is an association football stadium located in San Pedro del Pinatar, Murcia, Spain. The 3,000-seat stadium is part of the larger Pinatar Arena Football Center which also includes a sports club, hotel, training fields, and other amenities.

Events
Since opening in January 2013 it has become a popular destination for training camps and friendly matches by association football national teams. It has also hosted some of Europe's professional football clubs for friendlies, including St Johnstone, Newcastle United, Ipswich Town, Mallorca and Bradford City A.F.C.

References

External links
Official website
Soccerway profile

Football venues in Spain
Murcia